Abida Khan is a Pakistani former cricketer who played as an all-rounder. She appeared in two One Day Internationals for Pakistan in 1997, both against New Zealand. Following her playing career, she became the coach of the Jammu and Kashmir women's cricket team.

References

External links
 
 

Date of birth missing (living people)
Year of birth missing (living people)
Living people
Pakistani women cricketers
Pakistan women One Day International cricketers
Place of birth missing (living people)